The Indian bush rat (Golunda ellioti) is a rodent species in the family Muridae. It is the only extant member of the genus Golunda, and is the only extant member of the tribe Arvicanthini found outside of Africa.

The species is widely distributed in the Indian subcontinent west to Kohat and east to Guwahati. It also occurs in Sri Lanka. In addition, an isolated population exists in southeastern Iran. As many as 11 subspecies are recognized.

The genus name is derived from the Kannada name of Gulandi while the specific name is after Sir Walter Elliot. The nominate form is from southern India. Other forms include limitaris (northwestern limits), paupera (Punjab), watsoni (Sind), gujerati (Gujarat), bombax (Bombay), coraginis (Coorg), coffaeus (Sri Lanka), newera (Sri Lanka), myiothrix (Nepal) and coenosa (Bhutan Duars, Hasimara).

Description
Head and body length is 12–14 cm. Tail is 9–11. Yellowish brown upperparts are speckled with black and reddish yellow. Ventral surface grayish with a yellowish speckle. Orange-yellow incisor teeth. Tail, dark above and yellowish below. Body fur spiny. Rounded head with a blunt nose, with small eyes mark. Relatively short bill.

References

Old World rats and mice
Rats of Asia
Rodents of India
Mammals of Pakistan
Mammals of Nepal
Mammals of Sri Lanka
Fauna of Iran
Mammals described in 1837
Taxa named by John Edward Gray
Taxonomy articles created by Polbot